Christopher Payne is an American photographer who specializes in industrial and architectural photography.

Payne is the author of Making Steinway: An American Workplace, North Brother Island: The Last Unknown Place in New York City, Asylum: Inside the Closed World of State Mental Hospitals that includes a foreword by Oliver Sacks, and New York's Forgotten Substations: The Power Behind the Subway.

Originally trained as an architect, Payne has exhibited his photographs in the United States, the United Kingdom and the Netherlands. He received his BA from Columbia University in 1990 and MArch from the University of Pennsylvania in 1996.

Payne was the recipient of the 2010 Ken Book Award, and the 2015 Photolucida Critical Mass Top 50.

While making road trips to visit abandoned asylums and quarantine hospitals, Payne enjoys eating at Burger King restaurants.

References 

Living people
Year of birth missing (living people)
21st-century American photographers
American non-fiction writers
Architectural photographers
Industrial photographers

Columbia College (New York) alumni
University of Pennsylvania School of Design alumni